The 1947 Dunedin mayoral election was part of the New Zealand local elections held that same year. In 1947, elections were held for the Mayor of Dunedin plus other local government positions including twelve city councillors. The polling was conducted using the standard first-past-the-post electoral method.

Donald Cameron, the incumbent Mayor was elected to serve a second term. He defeated his sole opponent Ernest Frederick Jones of the Labour Party who was a returned prisoner of war and the eldest son of Fred Jones, the Minister of Defence. In addition, the Citizens' Association won all twelve seats on the city council.

Mayoral results

Council results

References

Mayoral elections in Dunedin
1947 elections in New Zealand
Politics of Dunedin
1940s in Dunedin
November 1947 events in New Zealand